Loricaster rotundus is a species of minute beetle in the family Clambidae. It is found in North America.

References

Further reading

 

Scirtoidea
Articles created by Qbugbot
Beetles described in 1961